Washington Township is a township in Jefferson County, in the U.S. state of Arkansas. The township was established in 1852. Its population was 9,011 as of the 2020 census. The only city is White Hall.

References

1852 establishments in Arkansas
Populated places established in 1852
Townships in Jefferson County, Arkansas